Exocarpos homalocladus, commonly known as the grass tree, is a flowering plant in the sandalwood family.

Description
It is a shrub or small tree growing to 4 m in height. The flat cladodes are 50–100 mm long, 1–2 mm wide. True leaves only occur on juvenile shoots; they are narrowly lanceolate, 50–80 mm long, 5–15 mm wide. The tiny yellow-green flowers occur in clusters from March to July. The fruits are red and fleshy, 8 mm long and seated on swollen red stalks that turn translucent pink when ripe.

Distribution and habitat
The species is endemic to Australia’s subtropical Lord Howe Island in the Tasman Sea, where it is fairly common and found from sea level to the summits of the mountains.

References

homalocladus
Endemic flora of Lord Howe Island
Plants described in 1872
Taxa named by Ferdinand von Mueller
Taxa named by Charles Moore